The Twisted Tales of Felix the Cat is an American animated television series produced by Film Roman. The series first aired on September 16, 1995 on CBS lasting for two seasons with the final episode airing on April 12, 1997. The first season consists of 13 episodes and the second and final season consists of 8 episodes.

This is the second television series featuring Felix the Cat; the first was the 1958–1960 series Felix the Cat.

The show has Spanish-dubbed episodes of the series aired on Saturday mornings on Univision in the United States from September 16, 2000 to September 8, 2001 as part of the ¡De Cabeza! block as Los Nuevos Cuentos de Felix el Gato. It also has Spanish-dubbed episodes of the series aired on Saturday and Sunday mornings on Telefutura in 2003 as part of Toonturama as Las Nuevas Aventuras de Felix el Gato along with Bruno the Kid and Mortal Kombat: Defenders of the Realm.

History
The show was a modern take of the original 1958–1962 series produced by Otto Messmer's former assistant, Joe Oriolo. His son, Don Oriolo, was involved in the creation of this series as well.

In many ways, the show reverts to the silent era of shorts with surreal settings and offbeat character depictions. Felix is also more like his original mischievous adult form, rather than the young and innocent depiction from the 1936 Van Beuren shorts, the 1959 TV series and Felix the Cat: The Movie. It does, however, contain some elements from the 1950s series such as Felix's Magic Bag of Tricks and the characters Poindexter, the Master Cylinder, the Professor and Rock Bottom (though the latter two are actually parodies of the original characters, with their names being the Mad Doctor and Lead Fanny, respectively). The series had a Fleischer Studios-inspired art style.

The series starred Thom Adcox-Hernandez as the voice of Felix the Cat, but since Adcox-Hernandez's voice was apparently a temporary role while the producers kept looking for a more suitable actor by the first season's run, he was replaced by Charlie Adler in Season 2. It was produced by Phil Roman and Timothy Berglund and is reputed to have been one of the most expensive cartoons ever made by Film Roman. Martin Olson and Jeremy Kramer, two comedy writers known for pushing the envelope into the bizarre, wrote both outlines and scripts for the series. The main theme was composed by Don Oriolo, while the musical score and closing theme were composed and performed by the Club Foot Orchestra.

Characters
Felix the Cat: The main character and star of the show. He has many adventures with his secret bag of tricks that often helps in dangerous situations. (voiced by Thom Adcox-Hernandez in season 1 and Charlie Adler in season 2)

Allies
 Rosco: (voiced by Phil Hayes) - Felix's dim-witted best friend.
 Candy Kitty: (voiced by Jennifer Hale) - Rosco's sister and Felix's love interest.
 Sheba Beboporeba: (voiced by Cree Summer) - Felix's friend.
 Shamus T. Goldcrow: (voiced by Tony Pope) -  An anthropomorphic crow.
 Skiddoo the Mouse: (voiced by Susan Silo) - One of Felix's friends.
 Bermuda Triangle: He is an anthropomorphic version of the location of the same name. He wreaks havoc because of his stupidity. He caused all sorts of chaos in New York City until he fell in love with Times Square. The two ended up getting married.
 Nastasshia Slinky: (voiced by Jane Singer) - An actress who Felix is obsessed with. She however, never returns the feelings. In fact, she hates Felix and wants nothing to do with him, not showing him even the slightest grip of affection. 
: (voiced by Cam Clarke) He is the nerdy young nephew of the Professor and is Felix's other best friend. He is depicted as a stereotypical scientist; he is very intelligent and always wears thick Coke-bottle glasses, a lab coat, and a mortarboard.  A button on the chest of his lab coat acts as a control for whatever device the plot calls for. Despite the Professor being his uncle, he is also one of Felix's best friends. Whenever he talks to Felix, he refers to him as "Mr. Felix".
 Guardian Angel: (voiced by Jeff Bennett)

Villains
Peking Duck: (voiced by Tony Jay) - An antagonist.
 Moo Shoo and One-Ton: (voiced by Kevin Schon and Jim Cummings) - Peking Duck's henchman.
 The Sludge King:
 Fufu Gauche: (voiced by Brad Garrett) - A disgraced fashion designer who tries to get revenge on the city by replacing everyone's clothes with his tacky fish costumes.
 Oscar: (voiced by Jeffrey Tambor) - A minor villain whose sole appearance was in the episode "Phoney Phelix", serving as one of the most pathetic foes Felix has ever faced. A wanna-be cartoon star who met failure at every step of the way, Oscar sought to climb his way to stardom by hijacking Felix's own cartoon, despite being a painfully obvious impersonator.
 Fuzzy Bunny: (voiced by Rob Paulsen) - A cutesy toy rabbit who manages to replace Felix's own show and become a nationwide sensation, thanks to how cute he is. In truth however, he is actually a gruesome thug in a rabbit suit.
 Froggy and Fuzzyman: (voiced by Jeff Bennett) - Fuzzy Bunny's henchman.
 Bet a Billion Bill: (voiced by Daran Norris) - A smooth-talking and arrogant hotshot playboy gambler.
 Captain Herman: (voiced by Tom Kenny)
 Mad Doctor: (voiced by Pat Fraley) He is a parody of the Professor from the 1958-60 Felix the Cat series.  
 Leadfanny: (voiced by Billy West) He is a parody of Rock Bottom from the 1958-60 Felix the Cat series. He is a stereotypically gay dog whose voice is an imitation of actor Harvey Fierstein. Leadfanny is Mad Doctor's assistant.
 Black Cats Leader: (voiced by Greg Burson)
 Black Cats Gatekeeper: (voiced by Dan Castellaneta) - Black Cats Leader's henchman.

Cast
 Thom Adcox-Hernandez - Felix the Cat (season 1)
 Charlie Adler - Felix the Cat (season 2), additional voices
 Jeff Bennett - Froggy, Fuzzyman, additional voices
Mary Kay Bergman - Mermaid, additional voices
Greg Burson - Black Cats Leader, additional voices
Dan Castellaneta - Black Cats Gatekeeper, Additional voices
 Cam Clarke - Poindexter, additional voices
 Townsend Coleman - Additional voices
 Jim Cummings - One-Ton, additional voices
 Jennifer Darling - Additional voices
 Debi Derryberry - Additional voices
 Jeannie Elias - Additional voices
Patrick Fraley - Mad Doctor, additional voices
 Brad Garrett - Fufu Gauche, additional voices
 Michael Gough - Additional voices
 Jennifer Hale - Candy Kitty, additional voices
Jess Harnell - Patties, Building, additional voices
 Phil Hayes - Rosco, additional voices
 Tony Jay - Peking Duck, additional voices
Tom Kane - Birthdayland Announcer, additional voices
 Tom Kenny - Captain Herman, additional voices
 Maurice LaMarche - Additional voices
 Mr. Lawrence - Additional voices
Pat Musick - Woman Customer, additional voices
Gary Owens - Radio Announcer, additional voices
 Rob Paulsen - Fuzzy Bunny, additional voices
 Patrick Pinney - additional voices
 Tony Pope - Shamus T. Goldcrow, additional voices
 Roger Rose - Additional voices
 Kevin Schon - Moo Shoo, additional voices
 Roger Scott - Additional voices
 Susan Silo - Skiddoo the Mouse, additional voices
 Jane Singer - Nastasshia Slinky
 Cree Summer - Sheba Beboporeba, additional voices
 Jeffrey Tambor - Oscar
 Frank Welker - Additional voices
 Billy West - LeadFanny, additional voices

Crew
 Susan Blu - Voice Director (Season 1, ep. 18, ep. 19, ep. 20)
 Mark Evanier - Story Editor (Season 2), Voice Director (ep. 14, ep. 15)
 Craig Kellman - Producer (Season 2), Voice Director (ep. 16, ep. 17, ep. 21)

Home media
Some of the episodes were released on VHS and DVD by BMG Video in North America, and several DVD releases of episodes were available in Hong Kong under the title "The Twisted Tales of Felix the Cat II". A 3-DVD box set of the entire series was released on April 26, 2013, exclusively in Germany, containing 21 episodes or 58 individual segments, this release being the first complete collection with an English soundtrack. As of 2020, the series is available to stream on the NBCUniversal streaming service, Peacock.

Episodes

Season 1 (1995–96)

Season 2 (1996–97)

Broadcast
The series first aired on September 16, 1995 on CBS lasting for two seasons with the final episode airing on April 12, 1997. The first season consists of 13 episodes and the second and final season consists of 8 episodes. It also has Spanish-dubbed episodes of the series aired on Saturday and Sunday mornings on Telefutura in 2003.

References

External links

Episode index at the Big Cartoon DataBase

1990s American animated television series
1990s American surreal comedy television series
1995 American television series debuts
1997 American television series endings
American animated television spin-offs
American children's animated comedy television series
Animated television series about cats
English-language television shows
Felix the Cat television series
Television series by Film Roman
Television series by Universal Television
CBS original programming